Milesia arnoldi is a species of hoverfly in the family Syrphidae.

Distribution
Zimbabwe.

References

Insects described in 1932
Eristalinae
Diptera of Africa
Taxa named by John Russell Malloch